Between Two Women is a 1937 American drama film directed by George B. Seitz and written by Frederick Stephani and Marion Parsonnet. The film stars Franchot Tone, Maureen O'Sullivan, Virginia Bruce, Leonard Penn and Cliff Edwards. The film was released on July 9, 1937, by Metro-Goldwyn-Mayer.

Plot

A love triangle forms between a doctor, a nurse, and an heiress.

Cast 
Franchot Tone as Allan Meighan
Maureen O'Sullivan as Claire Donahue
Virginia Bruce as Patricia Sloan
Leonard Penn as Tony Woolcott
Cliff Edwards as Snoopy
Janet Beecher as Miss Pringle
Charley Grapewin as Dr. Webster
Helen Troy as Sally
Grace Ford as Nurse Howley
June Clayworth as Eleanor
Edward Norris as Dr. Barili
Anthony Nace as Tom Donahue
Hugh Marlowe as Priest

References

External links 
 

1937 films
1937 romantic drama films
American black-and-white films
American romantic drama films
Films directed by George B. Seitz
Metro-Goldwyn-Mayer films
1930s English-language films
1930s American films